June Rose Bellamy, also Yadana Nat-Mei (lit. Goddess of the Nine Jewels, 1 June 1932 – 1 December 2020) was the First Lady of Myanmar as the fourth wife of the 4th President of Burma Ne Win. She was a Burmese royal princess of Australian descent and the great-granddaughter of Prince Kanaung.

Early life and career

June Rose was born on 1 June 1932 in Rangoon, British Burma. She was the great-granddaughter of Prince Kanaung Mintha and granddaughter of Prince Limbin. She was the only daughter of Princess Hteiktin Ma Lat of Konbaung, and Herbert Bellamy, an Australian orchid collector long settled in Burma. She was educated at St Joseph's Convent School, Kalimpong, India, also educated in Rangoon, Burma. After the war, as a teenager, she wrote an essay for a competition called "The World We Want", sponsored by the New York Herald Tribune, which won a prize to visit the US along with 30 international students. She became a TV host in the Philippines and took up painting.

June Rose was offered a female lead role in the war film The Purple Plain, as the young Burmese nurse who gives a suicidal pilot (played by Gregory Peck) an interest in life, but says she pulled out during the shooting in Ceylon. "It was so Hollywood, it was ridiculous; it was an insult to anything that had to do with Burma," she said.

Marriage

First 

June Rose was first married to Mario Postiglione, a physician and Senior Malaria advisor of WHO in Rangoon, Damascus, Geneva and Manila. The couple divorced in 1954, after having two sons, Michael Bellamy Postiglione and Maurice Postiglione.

Second 
In 1963 June Rose met Ne Win, Burma's new military ruler, in Europe, where she was living. Ne Win suggested she come back to Burma, but she was unwilling to leave Italy. On a later visit he proposed. They married in 1976, but the marriage lasted only five months. Ne Win accused her of being a CIA spy and divorced her.

Later life and death
After she returned to Italy, June Rose taught International and Italian cooking in Florence, as well as carrying on charitable work, through Rangoon-based doctors, putting young Burmese students through medical school. She has since written cookbooks, including The Soul of Spice, featured at the 2017 Turin Book Fair.

June Rose died on 1 December 2020 at the age of 88.

In popular culture
Yadana Nat-Mei is the subject of Than Win Hlaing's historic book Yadana Nat-Mei or once First Lady, first published in 2015. 
According to her son Michele Postiglione Bellamy, June Rose completed her memoirs before her death which is expected to be published in June 2021. 
A documentary film about her life called Rhapsody in June is in the works.

References

External links
Studio June Bellamy, Oriental and Italian cuisine school

Konbaung dynasty
Burmese people of English descent
1932 births
2020 deaths
Family of Ne Win